Tiegbe Bamba (born 21 January 1991) is a French-born Ivorian professional basketball player and a member of the Ivory Coast national team.

Club career
Bamba started playing for the Limoges Under 21 Basketball club in the Pro A French U21 basketball league at the age of 19. During the 2015–2016 season, he played for the Châlons-Reims in the French Jeep Elite league where he averaged 2.5 points. 

In 2016, he moved to the Greek side Psyhiko Athens where he averaged 6.7 points in three games.

In 2017, he signed with Liga Națională club BC Timba Timișoara where he averaged 9.2 points per game. In the same season, he moved to the LNB Pro B club STB Le Havre where he averaged 4.5 points.

In October 2018, Bamba signed with Úrvalsdeild karla club Grindavík. He was released by the club on 1 February 2019. In 11 games for Grindavík, he averaged 15.1 points and 9.2 rebounds per game. In January 2018 he moved to the C'Chartres Basket where he averaged 9.8 points per game.

In 2020, Bamba signed with Aix Maurienne Savoie Basket where he averaged 6.2 points in 10 games.

Ivorian National team
Bamba represents the Ivory Coast national basketball team. He participated at 2019 FIBA Basketball World Cup where he averaged 6 points.

References

External links
Profile at proballers.com
Icelandic statistics at Icelandic Basketball Association

1991 births
Living people
Aix Maurienne Savoie Basket players
Black French sportspeople
Champagne Châlons-Reims Basket players
Ivorian expatriate basketball people in Romania
Forwards (basketball)
French men's basketball players
French sportspeople of Ivorian descent
Grindavík men's basketball players
Ivorian men's basketball players
People from Sarcelles
Citizens of Ivory Coast through descent
Portland State Vikings men's basketball players
STB Le Havre players
Úrvalsdeild karla (basketball) players
2019 FIBA Basketball World Cup players
Sportspeople from Val-d'Oise
Ivorian expatriate basketball people in Iceland
Ivorian expatriate basketball people in the United States
French expatriate basketball people in Iceland
French expatriate basketball people in Romania
French expatriate basketball people in the United States